The Powder Toy is a falling-sand game originally created by Stanislaw K. Skowronek (also known as Skylark). It is now developed and maintained by LBPHacker along with various other contributors on GitHub. The Powder Toy is free and open-source software licensed under the GNU General Public License version 3.0. A total of 185 different in-game materials (or "elements"), each with custom behavior and interactions, are available in the game.

Gameplay 
The Powder Toy, like most falling sand games, is a sandbox video game that allows users to create things in-game to share with others. It is also possible to create new content for the game by using Lua to create new elements, tools, and content.

A public server for sharing in-game creations is provided as part of the game itself, allowing users to share anything that abides by the rules. Examples of player shared creations include functioning circulatory systems, nuclear power plants, and computers. Content is rated using upvotes and downvotes, and can be reported to the moderators if it breaks the on-site rules or plagiarizes other works.

Reception 
edgalaxy.com called The Powder Toy a "great science game" for its potential use as a learning aid through its accurate portrayal of physics, chemical reactions and more.

References

2010 video games
Online games
Simulation video games
Linux games
Windows games
MacOS games
Android (operating system) games
Non-games
Open-source video games
Free software that uses SDL
Free software programmed in C++
Video games about toys
Video games with available source code
Lua (programming language)-scripted video games
Cellular automata in computer games